Acrolepiopsis ussurica is a moth of the family Acrolepiidae. It is found in China (Tianjin) and Russia (Primorskiy kray, Amurskaya oblast).

References

Acrolepiidae
Moths described in 1981
Taxa named by Aleksei Konstantinovich Zagulyaev